The Montreal Aviation Museum, formerly the Canadian Aviation Heritage Centre, is an aviation museum located in Sainte-Anne-de-Bellevue, Quebec, Canada.

History
The Canadian Aviation Heritage Centre was established in 1998 by Godfrey Pasmore.  The museum opened to the public in 2009. The Canadian Aviation Heritage Centre changed its name to the Montreal Aviation Museum in 2016.

Collection
The museum collection includes the following aircraft:

Blériot XI
Fairchild Bolingbroke Mk IV
Fairchild FC-2
Fleet Canuck
Curtiss-Reid Rambler

Projects under restoration
Fairchild Bolingbroke Mk IV
Noorduyn Norseman
Canadair CF-104 Starfighter

See also
List of aviation museums

References

External links

Official website

Aerospace museums in Quebec
Museums in Montreal
Sainte-Anne-de-Bellevue, Quebec
Museums established in 1998
1998 establishments in Quebec